The Arattupuzha Temple is a Hindu temple situated at Arattupuzha in Thrissur district of Kerala in India, administered by Cochin Devaswom Board.

History
According to legends, the antiquity of this temple dates back to 3000 years. The temple has been the host of the most ancient and well-known yearly Devamela, a festival when all gods and goddesses assemble at Arattupuzha. It is believed that the deity of Arattupuzha temple is the embodiment of the divine potential of Guru Vasishta, the kulaguru (Family priest) of Raghu vamsha and Master of Srirama and his brothers.

References

External links

Hindu temples in Thrissur district
Rama temples